Czy jesteś mądrzejszy od 5-klasisty? is the Polish version of Are You Smarter Than a Fifth Grader? The show debuted on October 29, 2007, on TV Puls. It is hosted by journalist Marzena Rogalska (formerly by artist Robert Korólczyk). The grand prize on the show is 100,000 złotys (formerly zł300,000).

Only one person has won the largest prize (zł300,000), Aleksandra Chomacka. Her zł300,000 question was "What is the sum of the angles inside a square?". The correct answer was "360°".

Rules
Today version of the game:
 1. question • 50 zł
 2. question • 100 zł
 3. question • 200 zł
 4. question • 500 zł
 5. question • 1,500 zł (guaranteed sum)
 6. question • 3,000 zł
 7. question • 6,000 zł
 8. question • 12,000 zł
 9. question • 24,000 zł
 10. question • 48,000 zł
 11. question • 100,000 zł (bonus)
October 2007 - June 2008 version of the game:
 1. question • 100 zł
 2. question • 250 zł
 3. question • 500 zł
 4. question • 1,000 zł
 5. question • 2,500 zł (guaranteed sum)
 6. question • 5,000 zł
 7. question • 10,000 zł
 8. question • 25,000 zł
 9. question • 50,000 zł
 10. question • 100,000 zł
 11. question • 300,000 zł (bonus)

Rules are roughly the same as the original US version. The last question for 100,000 zł (earlier for 300,000 zł) is bonus - like in US version - so if player want to see the last question then he cannot resign.

Polish game shows
TV Puls original programming